Chireno is a city in Nacogdoches County, Texas, United States. The population was 386 at the 2010 census.

Geography

Chireno is located at  (31.498774, –94.345574).

Demographics

As of the 2010 census Chireno had a population of 386.  The median age was 40.  The racial makeup of the population was 75.9% white, 14.2% black or African American, 8.3% from some other race and 1.6% from two races (in this case all both white and Native American).  11.1% of the population was Hispanic or Latino of any race.

As of the census of 2000, there were 405 people, 156 households, and 109 families residing in the city. The population density was 216.1 people per square mile (83.6/km2). There were 180 housing units at an average density of 96.1 per square mile (37.2/km2). The racial makeup of the city was 82.96% White, 12.59% African American, 0.99% from other races, and 3.46% from two or more races. Hispanic or Latino of any race were 6.17% of the population.

There were 156 households, out of which 30.1% had children under the age of 18 living with them, 52.6% were married couples living together, 13.5% had a female householder with no husband present, and 30.1% were non-families. 28.8% of all households were made up of individuals, and 16.0% had someone living alone who was 65 years of age or older. The average household size was 2.60 and the average family size was 3.21.

In the city, the population was spread out, with 25.7% under the age of 18, 8.9% from 18 to 24, 25.2% from 25 to 44, 22.0% from 45 to 64, and 18.3% who were 65 years of age or older. The median age was 36 years. For every 100 females, there were 84.9 males. For every 100 females age 18 and over, there were 81.3 males.

The median income for a household in the city was $25,625, and the median income for a family was $35,833. Males had a median income of $25,625 versus $20,227 for females. The per capita income for the city was $14,099. About 17.6% of families and 23.9% of the population were below the poverty line, including 37.9% of those under age 18 and 21.1% of those age 65 or over.

Climate
The climate in this area is characterized by hot, humid summers and generally mild to cool winters.  According to the Köppen Climate Classification system, Chireno has a humid subtropical climate, abbreviated "Cfa" on climate maps.

Notable people
Ann Miller, actress

References

External links

 Official site

Cities in Texas
Cities in Nacogdoches County, Texas